Krzysztof Lepianka (born June 6, 1956) is a Polish sprint canoer who competed in the late 1970s and early 1980s. He won three medals in the K-4 10000 m at the ICF Canoe Sprint World Championships with two silvers (1978, 1979) and a bronze (1977).

Lepianka competed in the K-2 1000 m event at the 1980 Summer Olympics in Moscow, but was eliminated in the repechagés.

References

Sports-reference.com profile

1956 births
Canoeists at the 1980 Summer Olympics
Living people
Olympic canoeists of Poland
Polish male canoeists
Sportspeople from Warsaw
ICF Canoe Sprint World Championships medalists in kayak